Vanono is a town and commune in Madagascar. It belongs to the district of Mananara Nord, which is a part of Analanjirofo Region. The population of the commune was estimated to be approximately 14,000 in 2001 commune census.

Only primary schooling is available. The majority 98% of the population of the commune are farmers.  The most important crops are rice and vanilla; also cloves is an important agricultural product. Services provide employment for 2% of the population.

</ref>

References and notes 

Populated places in Analanjirofo